Escondido Village may refer to:
 a complex of Stanford University student housing
 Escondido Village Mall, California's first enclosed mall